Jackson Garcia Futebol Clube, is a sports club from Benguela, Angola. The club made its debut at the Gira Angola, the second division of Angolan football in 2014.

The club is named after club owner, Angolan businessman Jackson Garcia.

League & Cup Positions

Achievements
Angolan League: 

Angolan Cup: 

Angolan SuperCup: 

Benguela provincial championship:  1 
 2015

Staff

Manager history

Players

See also
Girabola
Facebook

References

External links
 

Football clubs in Angola
Sports clubs in Angola